Vanessa Grout is an American real estate entrepreneur, investor and journalist. She was CEO of South Florida real estate brokerage Douglas Elliman during which time she restructured and expanded the company throughout South Florida.
She is currently CEO of OKO Real Estate, an affiliate of International property development company OKO Group, founded by Vladislav Doronin developer and CEO of Aman Resorts, and recently acquired a 6.7-acre site in downtown Fort Lauderdale. She is also the Head of Global Residences & Club for Aman Resorts. Grout is a licensed attorney and real estate broker and a regular contributor to Forbes on the topics of real estate and business.

Douglas Elliman

Vanessa Grout was appointed CEO of Douglas Elliman Florida by Howard Lorber, chairman of Douglas Elliman Realty and CEO of Vector Group Ltd.. Through its real estate arm, New Valley LLC, Vector Group owns Douglas Elliman Realty, the largest residential brokerage company in New York.

Philanthropy

Vanessa Grout is a member of the Young Presidents Organization (YPO), a founder of the Mount Sinai Medical Center in Miami Beach, and a member of the board of trustees for the Miami Science Museum. Vanessa Grout is on the advisory board of the University of Miami School of Architecture  and the Leadership Advisory Board of FIU College of Architecture and The Arts.

Personal life

Vanessa Grout was born in Miami, Florida, the daughter of Melanie and John Frederick Grout, Jr. She attended The Benjamin School, an independent college preparatory school in North Palm Beach, Florida.  She earned her bachelor's degree from the University of Miami, a law degree from St. Thomas University School of Law and an MBA in finance from NYU Stern School of Business.  While a law student in Miami, she clerked for attorney Roy Black, who defended William Kennedy Smith.

References

External links
 Vector Group Ltd. Official Web Site
 CMC Group Inc. Official Web Site
 OKO Group Official Web Site

Businesspeople from Miami
1979 births
University of Miami alumni
New York University Stern School of Business alumni
American women chief executives
Living people
21st-century American women